George E Ravenhall (1886–1977) was an Australian public servant of 46 years, responsible for managing the storage and transportation of munitions during World War II.

Born George Ernest Ravenhall in Victoria in about 1886, his father was Alfred Ravenhall and mother Emily Woodbridge. He married Isabella Gertrude Dean (c1885-c1943), daughter of George Dean and Isabella Gertrude Wilson, in about 1913 and had two sons: George Dean Ravenhall; and Ernest Creese Ravenhall (1917-c 1971).

Ravenhall had a long career in the Commonwealth Public Service, commencing in the Defence Department, then the Department of Munitions, and finally as Executive Officer of the Dangerous Cargoes Movements Section, Department of Supply and Shipping.

When the Second World War broke out in September 1939, Ravenhall was Controller of the Stores and Transport Directorate located on a nine hectare site at the Government Ordnance Factory at Maribyrnong. Although considered the Cinderella of the department, Ravenhall was responsible for a staff of 30 and a fleet of 20 motor and horse-drawn vehicles. In June 1940, the head-office had been transferred to Cordite Avenue at Maribyrnong. In the following year Ravenhall was given responsibility for Defence Department transport operations across the country under a separate Transport Branch located at 83 William Street, Melbourne.

Ravenhall was appointed president of the Association of Charge Engineers in 1946.

Ravenhall was also closely involved in the North Melbourne Football Club for much of his adult life, serving as president in 1922. and being made a life member in 1950. He was also president of the Flemington Bowling Club in 1954, and Chairman of the VFL Umpires Appointment Board in 1943.

He died in 1977.

The locality of Ravenhall, Victoria, takes its name from the Ravenhall Munitions Siding, which was established during World War II and named after Ravenhall.

References

1886 births
Public servants from Melbourne
1977 deaths